The following page lists the mountain peaks of Sri Lanka.

Mountains

See also

References

 
Mountains
Sri Lanka
Mountains
Sri Lanka